Northcote Town Hall is an arts and community center located in High Street in Northcote, a suburb of Melbourne, Australia.

Town hall
It was designed in the Classic Revival style by George Johnson and built in 1887 as the municipal offices and council chambers for the City of Northcote.

Arts and Community centre
After the amalgamation of the City of Northcote with the City of Preston in 1994 to form the City of Darebin, the Town Hall was redeveloped and renovated into an Arts, Community and Cultural venue.

The town hall now boasts seven meeting rooms for community meetings, training and passive recreation, two large studios for performances and events,  a large main hall for functions and events seating  up to 300 people and  an outdoor civic square used for outdoor markets and performances.

As well as being an ideal performance and conference space, many of the rooms are used for rehearsal groups, children's music groups and passive recreation spaces for yoga and pilates.

See also
List of Town Halls in Melbourne

External links and references
Official Northcote Town Hall website
Darebin Arts
Darebin Historical Encyclopedia: Northcote Town Hall (images)
Northcote Town Hall location map

Town halls in Melbourne
Neoclassical architecture in Australia
1887 establishments in Australia
Buildings and structures in the City of Darebin
Government buildings completed in 1887